Batrachyla fitzroya is a species of frog in the family Batrachylidae. It is endemic to Argentina and only known from its type locality, Isla Grande in Lake Menéndez, in the Los Alerces National Park, Chubut Province. The specific name fitzroya refers to Fitzroya cupressoides, a prominent tree at the type locality.

Description
They eyes are inconspicuous. The tympanum is small, about half of the eye diameter. The snout is rounded in dorsal view and truncated in lateral view. The fingers and the toes are long; the fingers are free from webbing but the toes are basally webbed. The dorsum is brown with darker, diffuse blotches. There is a V-shaped inter-ocular band and concave supra-scapular bands. The limbs are cross-banded. The belly is unpigmented apart from some minute gray spots. Dorsal skin is smooth.

Habitat and conservation
Breeding habitat is unknown but could be small temporary pools. The species is locally common within its restricted range. Isla Grande is a highly protected area and entirely with the limits of the Los Alerces National Park.

References

fitzroya
Amphibians of Patagonia
Amphibians of Argentina
Endemic fauna of Argentina
Amphibians described in 1994
Taxonomy articles created by Polbot